

Meaning 
Vogler comes from the word "fugol", denoted as bird, In the 7th century it was also used as a way to express love.

Origins 
Is originally from German but it is from both Anglo-Saxon and Old English pre7th century.

Vogler originally recorded in Germany as Vogil and Fogel and in England was derived as Fugel and Foul.

Vogler surname has many variations, deriving from England and Germany some of this variation are:

England Spelling of Vogler

Gowle, Fowell, Fowler, Fuggle, and Vowell, to the patronymics Fowles, Vowells, Vouls and Fuggles.

Germany Spelling of Vogler

Vogel, Vogl, Vogler, Vogeller, and diminutives Vogele, Vogelein and Vogelin.

Occupations & History 
Vogler surname derived from an occupational name for someone who was a fowler, or birdcatcher.

In the 13th century in Switzerland and Germany In medieval times, the word as "fugel" was used as a nickname for someone who was related or resemble to a bird, or to have the characteristics associated with one or have any similarities to one.

Early examples of the name recording are those of Heinrich Vogil of Zurich, Switzerland, in the year 1230, Nicholas le Fowel of Worcestershire, England, in 1275, and Konrad Fogel of Eblingen, Germany, in 1297. The first recorded spelling of the surname is believed to be that of Wuluard Fugel. This was dated 1166, in the Pipe Rolls of the county of Kent, England. Throughout the centuries surnames in every country have continued to "develop", often leading to astonishing variants of the original spelling.

Notable People 
Notable people with the surname include:

 Andreas Vogler, Swiss architect and designer
 Andreas Vogler (footballer), German footballer
 Bernard Vogler (1935–2020), French historian and academic
 Bert Vogler, South African cricketer
 Brian Vogler (1932–2009), Australian footballer and coal miner
 Candace Vogler, professor of philosophy at the University of Chicago
 Christopher Vogler, American film development executive
 Georg Joseph Vogler (1749–1814), German composer, organist, teacher and theorist
 Joe Vogler (1913–1993), American politician of the Alaskan Independence Party
 Johann Caspar Vogler (1696–1763), German composer and organist
 Karl Michael Vogler (1928–2009), German actor
 Kathrin Vogler (born 1963), German politician
 Matt Vogler (born 1969), American football player
 Peter Vogler (born 1964), Australian baseball coach and former player
 Rich Vogler (1950–1990), champion sprint car and midget car driver
 Rüdiger Vogler (born 1942), German film and stage actor

References

German-language surnames
Occupational surnames